The Destroyer of Delights is a Big Finish Productions audio drama based on the long-running British science fiction television series Doctor Who.

Plot
The search for The Key to Time brings the Doctor to 9th century Sudan, where he meets a treasure-hoarding Djinni.

Cast
The Doctor – Peter Davison
Amy – Ciara Janson
The Black Guardian/Lord Cassim – David Troughton
Legate of the Caliph – Jason Watkins
Nisrin – Jess Robinson
Prince Omar – Bryan Pilkington
Hassan – Paul Chahidi
The Djinni – Will Barton
The Vizier – David Peart

External links
Big Finish – The Destroyer of Delights
Den of Geek Review

2009 audio plays
Fifth Doctor audio plays
Fiction set in the 9th century